Nathan Lovejoy (born 2 December 1981) is an Australian actor, known for his roles as Principal Swift on the Disney Channel sci-fi teen sitcom  Gabby Duran & the Unsittables, for which he was nominated for a Daytime Creative Arts Emmy Award for Outstanding Principal Performance in a Children's Program; and as Borkman in the Australian comedy series Sammy J & Randy in Ricketts Lane, for which he was nominated for an AACTA Award for Best Performance in a Television Comedy.

He also appeared as Felix Rolleston in the TV movie The Mystery of a Hansom Cab and Will Sharp in season 2 of the ABC political thriller The Code.

Life and career
Lovejoy was born in Launceston, Tasmania. He attended Vermont Secondary College and is a graduate of the National Institute of Dramatic Art (NIDA).

Filmography

Theatre

Awards

Nominated – AACTA Award for Best Performance in a Television Comedy, Sammy J & Randy in Ricketts Lane (2015)

Nominated – Daytime Creative Arts Emmy Award for Outstanding Principal Performance in a Children's Program, Gabby Duran & the Unsittables (2021)

References

External links
 

Australian male film actors
Australian male television actors
1981 births
21st-century Australian male actors
Living people
People from Launceston, Tasmania